The Work and Families Act 2006 (c 18) is an Act of the Parliament of the United Kingdom.

Section 19 - Commencement
Orders made under section 19(2):
The Work and Families Act 2006 (Commencement No. 1) Order 2006 (S.I. 2006/1682 (C.58))
The Work and Families Act 2006 (Commencement No. 2) Order 2006 (S.I. 2006/2232 (C.76))
The Work and Families Act 2006 (Commencement No. 3) Order 2010 (S.I. 2010/128 (C.15))
The Work and Families Act 2006 (Commencement No. 4) Order 2010 (S.I. 2010/495 (C.35))

See also
 Halsbury's Statutes

References

External links
The Work and Families Act 2006, as amended from the National Archives.
The Work and Families Act 2006, as originally enacted from the National Archives.
Explanatory notes to the Work and Families Act 2006.

United Kingdom Acts of Parliament 2006